Tracy Island is the secret headquarters of the International Rescue organisation in the 1960s British Supermarionation television series Thunderbirds and its adaptations. In the original series, the heavily-camouflaged island is located in the South Pacific Ocean and is home to the Tracy family, scientists Brains and Tin-Tin, and housekeeper Kyrano. The name "Tracy Island" originates in Thunderbirds comic strips and other tie-in media; in the series itself, the characters refer to it simply as International Rescue's "base".

The island has had several releases as a children's toy, most notably in the early 1990s, 2000 and 2015. The first two models were commercially very successful, causing retailers to run out of stock. It was the 1993 British Association of Toy Retailers' Toy of the Year.

Depiction
The centrepiece of the island is the Tracy Villa, the home of the island's residents. Various features of the original series' villa – such as the outside staircase descending to water, the large windows, and the prominent stone chimney – suggest that its design was inspired by Frank Lloyd Wright's Fallingwater house.

Thunderbird 1 is launched from a hangar underneath the island's retractable swimming pool, at the foot of the villa. The entrance to the Thunderbird 2 hangar is concealed by a false rock-face and leads onto the island's runway. On exiting the hangar, the palm trees lining the runway swing outwards to accommodate the wingspan of Thunderbird 2. After taxiing along the runway, Thunderbird 2 takes off from a hydraulic launch platform. Thunderbird 3 is launched from underneath the Round House (the island's guest accommodation).

Although the security of the island is stated to be assured by jamming equipment, in the Thunderbirds comic strips published in TV Century 21 it proves to be somewhat vulnerable due to the machinations of the Hood. Learning everything about the island by brainwashing the technically-minded Brains and extracting all of his knowledge concerning the island, the Hood launches his strongest attack yet on IR, destroying several Thunderbird craft and many of their hangars, with the exception of Thunderbirds 1 and 4. (The canonicity of the Thunderbirds comics adventures is open to interpretation.)

Background

Derek Meddings, special effects supervisor on the puppet series, described his excitement at designing Tracy Island as "one of those feelings you get when you're a kid, imagining that you're Robinson Crusoe living on a lovely island."

For the 2004 live-action film, the main shooting location for the island exteriors was North Island in the Seychelles. Co-producer Mark Huffam described Tracy Island as "the most idyllic [...] imaginable, with crystal-clear waters, tropical jungle and mountainous peaks", adding that it was "fantastic" that North Island provided "all these essential elements". Various locations on Praslin, including Anse Lazio beach and Vallée de Mai nature preserve, were also used.

The buildings on the re-imagined island were deliberately given a "retro-futuristic" appearance, described by production designer John Beard as "based in the '60s and '70s, which is similar to what we were doing for Brazil." Further inspiration was drawn from the work of Oscar Niemeyer and others. The interiors set at Pinewood Studios was built in what Beard described as a "kind of double-'S' shape". He added that "because we're not building the top, it means we can hang the building from the top ceiling in the studio, which we couldn't have done outside."

Toys and Blue Peter
In the UK, repeats of Thunderbirds on BBC2 in the early 1990s led to renewed public interest in the series and a fresh wave of tie-in toys, including a Tracy Island playset by Matchbox. In the run-up to Christmas in 1992, demand for the set increased steeply and retailers ran out of stock, leading to overnight queues outside shops. The story was reported in the national news and has since been cited as the archetypal mistake to be avoided by the toy industry during the Christmas shopping season; according to the BBC, the toy "caused hysteria in shops across the UK." The playset was a contender for the British Association of Toy Retailers' (BATR) 1992 "Toy of the Year" Award, but lost to WWF Hasbro action figures on account of the stock shortage. It subsequently won the 1993 award.

In January 1993, the BBC children's TV programme Blue Peter responded to the stock shortage by showing viewers how to build a home-made version out of household waste. The BBC was then, in turn, overwhelmed by requests for copies of an instruction sheet for making the model. Eventually the broadcaster stopped sending out the sheets and released a recording of presenter Anthea Turner's demonstration, titled "Blue Peter Makes a Thunderbirds Tracy Island", on VHS. In 2015, Radio Times described Blue Peters island-building demonstration as "one of the most iconic moments" in the programme's history.

The BBC's re-launch of Thunderbirds in 2000 prompted a resurgence in the toy's popularity and a second Blue Peter demonstration. The new Tracy Island playset by Vivid Imaginations was released to a positive critical response and was listed as one of the top ten children's toys by the BATR. As before, supply of the toy did not keep up with demand. In December, the BBC reported that only 60,000 copies of the Chinese-made product would be shipped to the UK before Christmas, despite demand being estimated at half a million. Vivid attributed the stock shortage to a lack of microchips caused by high demand from the mobile phone industry. The playset ultimately became one of the best-selling toys of 2000, with demand estimated to be up to ten times greater than supply.

In 2015, to coincide with the debut of the remake series Thunderbirds Are Go, Vivid released a new Tracy Island toy incorporating smart technology.

Reception
Tim Bevan, producer of the live-action film, called Tracy Island "one of the main characters of the original Thunderbirds series". Rob McLaughlin of the entertainment website Den of Geek named it the seventh-best secret base in film and TV but challenged one particular design aspect: "There's the small matter of the ever-present risk of a great big rocket ship appearing out the bottom of [the swimming pool] and squashing you."

Jon Abbott of TV Zone magazine criticised the base's layout, questioning why the control centre is located in the lounge when a hidden control room would eliminate the need for "Operation Cover-Up" – the procedure used to rid the lounge of all trace of International Rescue's presence whenever the island receives visitors from the outside world. As part of this operation, wall portraits of the Tracy brothers in their International Rescue uniforms are replaced with alternatives showing them in casual attire. Abbott asks why Jeff Tracy would even need uniformed photographs of his sons, regarding this as one of several aspects that make the Tracy Island lounge a "delightful deranged indulgence". However, he concedes that for child viewers, the existence of these features made Thunderbirds "much more fun to watch than Z-Cars or Dr. Finlay's Casebook".

Commentator Ian Haywood, who interprets the series partly as a struggle between nature and science, considers Tracy Island a technological utopia where nature has been brought under human control, describing the location as "a perfect 'false self', a brilliantly simulated natural paradise". He also views it as an imperialist symbol in that it effectively serves as "a Pacific base for American influence", which he believes "strikes a chilling chord in today's post-Cold War era of American global peace-keeping."

In a publicity exercise, Ford Motor Company, which built the re-imagined FAB 1 for the live-action film, commissioned a Thunderbirds-themed live event and interactive experience for the 2004 British International Motor Show. The  stand was designed as a replica of Tracy Island, complete with a beach, a lake, an aircraft hangar and an overhead model of Thunderbird 2. Titled "Thunderbirds Powered By Ford", it was one of the largest exhibits ever built by construction company Imagination and proved to be a success, attracting 250,000-300,000 visitors and winning a certificate of "High Commendation" at the 2004 Marketing Brand Design Awards.

The new version that was modelled for the remake series Thunderbirds Are Go (2015–20) was positively received by Wired UK magazine, whose reporter Matt Kamen described the island as "stunningly detailed, and any returning viewers will be delighted to see classic features such as the retractable swimming pool revealing a rocket silo have been retained for the update."

In popular culture
Tracy Island and Thunderbirds are referenced in the Arctic Monkeys' song "R U Mine?" in the lines "I'm a puppet on a string / Tracy Island, time-travelling diamond".

References

External links

Blue Peter model-making demonstration at BBC Archive
Blue Peter instruction sheet at BBC Online

1990s toys
2000s toys
2010s toys
Electronic toys
Fictional elements introduced in 1965
Fictional islands
Fictional secret bases
Retrofuturism
Thunderbirds (TV series)